Tribal Research and Cultural Foundation, is a  community-supported nonprofit organization set up in 2000 with the objective to project tribal issues before authorities and to promote ethno- Cultural aspects of tribes. The Foundation was established to work on Gujjars studies and nomadic research in  Jammu and Kashmir (union territory).

Preservation of folklore of Gujjars  
The Tribals have a rich tradition of folk-songs and folk-tales. These treasure houses of folk wisdom are declining and are feared to vanish with the passage of time. Hence, there was an emergent need to collect, document and preserve the folk treasure of songs and tales. With a view to meet this objective, the Tribal Research and Cultural Foundation has undertaken documentation of tribal culture and artifacts.

Dictionaries in Gojri  
With the advent of literature, words acquired new meanings as well as usage. To facilitate the common reader to have a peep into the world of unknown words, the publication of dictionaries became essential. Most of our tribal regional languages started producing literature on a regular basis, uninterruptedly, since forties only, therefore, dictionaries were not available in these languages. Foundation published 2 Dictionaries  Folk-lore Dictionary of Ujjar Tribe, Hindi Gojri Dictionary in 2000-2004.

Encyclopedia of Himalayan Gujjars 
Keeping in view the importance of encyclopedia in the development of a language, Tribal Research and Cultural Foundation has taken in hand the publication of Encyclopaedia of Himalayan Gujjars in 2000 and first volume of this encyclopedia have been published in 2003  covering the following field of research:-
a)	Gujjar Archaeology & Architecture		 
b)	Gujjar Archeology, Architecture & Coins			
c)	Gujjar Handicrafts					
d)	Gojri Language & Literature

Seminars and conferences 
Most of Tribal  areas are nearly inaccessible. The tribal writers and artists residing in these far flung areas did not have the means and access to keep them abreast of changing trends on the literary scene. To bring writers of the State in close contact with one–another, Tribal Research and Cultural Foundation organized Mushairas, Seminars, Literary Conferences, Sham-i-Afsanas, Sham-i- Ghazals, and Literary Get-togethers at in villages.

Art conservation
To conserve and preserve priceless tribal artifacts, manuscripts, miniature paintings and other artifacts Tribal Research and Cultural Foundation has to established Museum at Jammu in future.

Field Activities
The Foundation has closed its  field and  collaborative  activities in 2014. However, research and study work is going on about the tribes without help from Government.

Similar links 
Gurjardesh Charitable  Trust, Jammu 

Charities based in India
Gurjar
Organisations based in Jammu and Kashmir
Linguistic research in India
1998 establishments in Jammu and Kashmir
Organizations established in 1998
Research institutes in India